The Symetra Classic was an annual golf tournament for professional women golfers on the Symetra Tour, the LPGA Tour's developmental tour. From 2009 to 2011, the tournament was played at The Dominion Country Club in San Antonio, Texas. The event moved to Charlotte, North Carolina in 2012 and was played at Raintree Country Club. It moved to Milton, Georgia in 2017 and was played at Atlanta National Golf Club. In 2018, it moved to River Run Country Club in Davidson, North Carolina.

The tournament was a 54-hole event, as were most Symetra Tour tournaments. The title sponsor of the tournament was Symetra Financial Corporation, a life insurance corporation with headquarters in Bellevue, Washington.

Tournament names through the years
2009–2010: Texas Hill Country Classic
2011–2021: Symetra Classic

Winners

Tournament record

References

External links
Coverage on the Symetra Tour's official site

Former Symetra Tour events
Golf in Georgia (U.S. state)
Golf in North Carolina
Golf in Texas